In topology, Borel−Moore homology or homology with closed support is a homology theory for locally compact spaces, introduced by Armand Borel and John Moore in 1960.

For reasonable compact spaces, Borel−Moore homology coincides with the usual singular homology. For non-compact spaces, each theory has its own advantages. In particular, a closed oriented submanifold defines a class in Borel–Moore homology, but not in ordinary homology unless the submanifold is compact.

Note: Borel equivariant cohomology is an invariant of spaces with an action of a group G; it is defined as  That is not related to the subject of this article.

Definition
There are several ways to define Borel−Moore homology. They all coincide for reasonable spaces such as manifolds and locally finite CW complexes.

Definition via sheaf cohomology
For any locally compact space X, Borel–Moore homology with integral coefficients is defined as the cohomology of the dual of the chain complex which computes sheaf cohomology with compact support. As a result, there is a short exact sequence analogous to the universal coefficient theorem:

In what follows, the coefficients  are not written.

Definition via locally finite chains
The singular homology of a topological space X is defined as the homology of the chain complex of singular chains, that is, finite linear combinations of continuous maps from the simplex to X. The Borel−Moore homology of a reasonable locally compact space X, on the other hand, is isomorphic to the homology of the chain complex of locally finite singular chains. Here "reasonable" means X is locally contractible, σ-compact, and of finite dimension.

In more detail, let  be the abelian group of formal (infinite) sums

where σ runs over the set of all continuous maps from the standard i-simplex Δi to X and each aσ is an integer, such that for each compact subset S of X, only finitely many maps σ whose image meets S have nonzero coefficient in u. Then the usual definition of the boundary ∂ of a singular chain makes these abelian groups into a chain complex:

The Borel−Moore homology groups  are the homology groups of this chain complex. That is,

If X is compact, then every locally finite chain is in fact finite. So, given that X is "reasonable" in the sense above, Borel−Moore homology  coincides with the usual singular homology  for X compact.

Definition via compactifications
Suppose that X is homeomorphic to the complement of a closed subcomplex S in a finite CW complex Y. Then Borel–Moore homology  is isomorphic to the relative homology Hi(Y, S). Under the same assumption on X, the one-point compactification of X is homeomorphic to a finite CW complex. As a result, Borel–Moore homology can be viewed as the relative homology of the one-point compactification with respect to the added point.

Definition via Poincaré duality
Let X be any locally compact space with a closed embedding into an oriented manifold M of dimension m. Then

where in the right hand side, relative cohomology is meant.

Definition via the dualizing complex
Then

where in the right hand side, hypercohomology is meant.

Properties
Borel−Moore homology is a covariant functor with respect to proper maps. That is, a proper map f: X → Y induces a pushforward homomorphism  for all integers i. In contrast to ordinary homology, there is no pushforward on Borel−Moore homology for an arbitrary continuous map f. As a counterexample, one can consider the non-proper inclusion 

Borel−Moore homology is a contravariant functor with respect to inclusions of open subsets. That is, for U open in X, there is a natural pullback or restriction homomorphism 

For any locally compact space X and any closed subset F, with  the complement, there is a long exact localization sequence:

Borel−Moore homology is homotopy invariant in the sense that for any space X, there is an isomorphism  The shift in dimension means that Borel−Moore homology is not homotopy invariant in the naive sense.

Poincaré duality extends to non-compact manifolds using Borel–Moore homology. Namely, for an oriented n-manifold X, Poincaré duality is an isomorphism from singular cohomology to Borel−Moore homology,

for all integers i. A different version of Poincaré duality for non-compact manifolds is the isomorphism from cohomology with compact support to usual homology:

A key advantage of Borel−Moore homology is that every oriented manifold M of dimension n (in particular, every smooth complex algebraic variety), not necessarily compact, has a fundamental class  If the manifold M has a triangulation, then its fundamental class is represented by the sum of all the top dimensional simplices. In fact, in Borel−Moore homology, one can define a fundamental class for arbitrary (possibly singular) complex varieties.

Examples

Compact Spaces
Given a compact topological space  its Borel-Moore homology agrees with its standard homology; that is,

Real line
The first non-trivial calculation of Borel-Moore homology is of the real line. Since this reduces to the case of a point , notice that we can take the Borel-Moore chain

Now, we can take the Borel-Moore chain

which has no boundary, hence is a homology class. This shows that

Real n-space
The previous computation can be generalized to the case  We get

Infinite Cylinder
Using the Kunneth decomposition, we can see that the infinite cylinder  has homology

Real n-space minus a point
Using the long exact sequence in Borel-Moore homology, we get the non-zero exact sequences

and

From the first sequence we get that

and from the second we get that

and

We can interpret these non-zero homology classes using the following observations:
 There is the homotopy equivalence  
 A topological isomorphism 

Plane with Points Removed
Let  have -distinct points removed. Notice the previous computation with the fact that Borel-Moore homology is an isomorphism invariant gives this computation for the case .

Double Cone
Consider the double cone . If we take  then the long exact sequence shows

Genus Two Curve with Three Points Removed 
Given a genus two curve (Riemann surface)  and three points , we can use the long exact sequence to compute the Borel-Moore homology of  This gives

Since  is only three points we have 

 

This gives us that  Using Poincare-duality we can compute 

 

since  deformation retracts to a one-dimensional CW-complex. Finally, using the computation for the homology of a compact genus 2 curve we are left with the exact sequence

showing

since we have the short exact sequence of free abelian groups

from the previous sequence.

Notes

References

Survey articles

Books 

Homology theory
Sheaf theory